The Great Britain women's national under-18 ice hockey team is the women's national under-18 ice hockey team of the United Kingdom. The team is controlled by Ice Hockey UK, a member of the International Ice Hockey Federation and currently play in Division I of the IIHF World Women's U18 Championships.

History
The Great Britain women's national under-18 ice hockey team played its first game in 2011 against France during the 2012 IIHF World Women's U18 Championship Division I Qualification being held in Asiago, Italy. Great Britain won the game 3–1 and finished second in the tournament earning one of the two qualification spots in the 2012 IIHF World Women's U18 Championship Division I tournament along with Hungary who finished first in the qualification tournament. During the qualification tournament Great Britain recorded their largest ever victory in international participation when they defeated Kazakhstan 8–0. They also recorded their largest loss when they were defeated by Hungary 1–8. During December 2011 to January 2012 Great Britain competed in the 2012 Division I tournament being held in Tromsø, Norway. They lost four of their five games during the tournament winning only against Slovakia 4–1.

World Women's U18 Championship record

^Includes one win in extra time (in the round robin)
*Includes one loss in extra time (in the round robin)

Team roster
From the 2012 IIHF World Women's U18 Championship Division I

References

External links
 Ice Hockey UK

I
Women's national under-18 ice hockey teams